Atletic Club Universitatea (ACU) Arad was a Romanian professional football club from the Arad County, founded in 1995. The club was dissolved in August 2011, after it withdrew from the Liga II championship due to financial difficulties.

Honours 
Liga III:
Runners-up (2): 2007–08, 2009–10

Liga IV – Arad County
Winners (4): 1998–99

Stadium 

ACU Arad played its home matches at Motorul Stadium, Arad, which has a capacity of 5,000 seats.

Performances 

Their best performance was a 13th place at the end of the 2003–04 season in the Liga II and reaching the Round of 32 phase in the Romanian Cup in the 2003–04 and 2007–08 seasons.

Notable Managers 
 Marcel Coraș
 Ioan Şold
 Mihai Jivan

References 

 
Association football clubs established in 1995
Association football clubs disestablished in 2011
Defunct football clubs in Romania
Football clubs in Arad County
Liga II clubs
Liga III clubs
Arad, Romania
1995 establishments in Romania
2011 disestablishments in Romania